Darren Erdley Stewart (born 30 December 1990) is an English mixed martial artist. A professional competitor since 2013, he competed in the Middleweight division of the Ultimate Fighting Championship and Cage Warriors.

Background
Stewart was born in Poplar, East London, England. His father was from Jamaica and his mother was from St Vincent. Encouraged by his mum, Stewart started MMA training at 13 for self-defence due to the crime rate was high in London with the youth during that time. His friend Regan Lawrence was at The MMA Clinic at that time and invited him to try on MMA, even though his initial thought was "I’m not doing that crap, cage fighting. I’ve seen the blood on TV. No way", but he eventually found MMA full contact striking exciting, and thrived where he competed in the UK and abroad.

Stewart works as a full-time prison officer for the Crown Court in London Bridge.

Mixed martial arts career

Early career
Stewart fought most of the fights in England and picked up seven consecutive wins with five by knockout before signed by UFC.  He was the former Killacam light heavy weight champion in England.

Ultimate Fighting Championship

Light heavyweight 
Stewart made his promotional debut on 17 September 2016, at UFC Fight Night: Bader vs. Nogueira 2 against Francimar Barroso  at São Paulo, Brazil. Stewart was initially declared the winner of the fight via TKO, but the decision was overturned by Comissao Atletica Brasileira de MMA (CABMMA), after an appeal from Borroso, as a result from an accidental head butt prior Stewart rained down a series of heavy punches. The bout was finally declared as no contest. Calling for a rematch when UFC would return to London, Stewart was displeased with the CABMMA decision and commented "The entire situation stinks. I put a lot of time and money into this fight, won the fight, and his mates at the Brazilian MMA Commission overturned the decision. Fighting a Brazilian in Brazil is something that every fighter should think very strongly about. Had I lost and made an appeal to the Brazil commission, I doubt it would be overturned because I’m not from Brazil.”

The match with Francimar Barroso was rescheduled on 18 March 2017, at UFC Fight Night: Manuwa vs. Anderson. He lost the fight via unanimous decision.

Middleweight 
After losing to Barroso in March 2017, Stewart announced he would compete in the middleweight division.

Stewart faced Karl Roberson on 11 November 2017 at UFC Fight Night: Poirier vs. Pettis. He lost the fight via submission in the first round.

Stewart faced promotional newcomer Julian Marquez on 16 December 2017 at UFC on Fox 26. He lost the back-and-forth bout via submission in the second round. Even though he lost the fight, he was awarded a Fight of the Night bonus award.

Stewart faced Eric Spicely on 27 May 2018 at UFC Fight Night 130.  He won the fight via technical knock out in the second round.  The win earned him his first Performance of the Night award.

Stewart faced Charles Byrd on 8 September 2018 at UFC 228. He won the fight via technical knockout.

Stewart faced promotional newcomer Edmen Shahbazyan on 30 November 2018 at The Ultimate Fighter 28 Finale. He lost the fight via split decision.

Stewart faced Bevon Lewis on 8 June 2019 at UFC 238. He won the fight by unanimous decision.

Stewart faced Deron Winn on 18 October 2019 at UFC on ESPN 6. At the weigh-in, Winn weighed in at 188.5 pounds, 2.5 pounds over the middleweight non-title fight limit of 186. The bout was held at catchweight and winn was fined 20% of his  purse which went to their opponents Stewart. He won the fight via split decision.

Stewart was scheduled to face Marvin Vettori on 21 March 2020 at UFC Fight Night: Woodley vs. Edwards. Due to the COVID-19 pandemic, the UFC bout was moved to Cage Warriors 113 main event in which he faced Bartosz Fabiński instead. Stewart lost the fight via unanimous decision.

Stewart faced Maki Pitolo on 8 August 2020 at UFC Fight Night 174. He won the fight via a guillotine choke in round one. This win earned him the Performance of the Night award.

Stewart faced Kevin Holland on 19 September 2020 at UFC Fight Night 178. He lost the fight via split decision.

Stewart faced Eryk Anders on 13 March 2021 at UFC Fight Night 187. Due to an illegal  knee thrown by Anders in round one, the fight was declared a no contest.

Stewart rematched Eryk Anders on June 12, 2021 at UFC 263. He lost the fight via unanimous decision.

Stewart faced Dustin Jacoby on August 28, 2021 at UFC on ESPN 30. He lost the fight via TKO in round one.

On August 31, 2021, it was announced that Stewart was released by UFC.

Post UFC

Stewart faced Mick Stanton at Cage Warriors 141 on July 22, 2022. He lost the bout via unanimous decision.

Reis faced Guilherme Cadena on December 31, 2022 at Cage Warriors 148, winning the bout via TKO stoppage in the first round due to elbows and punches on the ground.

Personal life
Stewart's moniker "The Dentist" refers to his opponents, whereby "He (his opponent) is just another patient who's gonna get drilled".

Stewart is an avid dancer and was a student of contemporary dance, ballet and street dance for GCSE. He was also a salsa dancing champion.

Stewart lives in Barking, London with his fiancée Katherine, an Ecuadorian, and his sons Marlon and Tyler.

Championships and accomplishments

Mixed martial arts
Ultimate Fighting Championship
Fight of the Night (One time)  vs. Julian Marquez
Performance of the Night (Two times) 
 Killacam Promotions 
 Killacam Promotions Light Heavyweight Champion (One time) 
One successful title defence

Mixed martial arts record

|-
|Win
|align=center|13–9 (2)
|Guilherme Cadena
|TKO (elbow and punches)
|Cage Warriors 148
|
|align=center|1
|align=center|2:07
|London, England
|
|-
|Loss
|align=center|12–9 (2)
|Mick Stanton
|Decision (unanimous)
|Cage Warriors 141
|
|align=center|3
|align=center|5:00
|London, England
|
|-
|Loss
|align=center|12–8 (2)
|Dustin Jacoby
|TKO (punches)
|UFC on ESPN: Barboza vs. Chikadze
|
|align=center|1
|align=center|3:04
|Las Vegas, Nevada, United States
|
|-
|Loss
|align=center|12–7 (2)
|Eryk Anders
|Decision (unanimous)
|UFC 263
|
|align=center|3
|align=center|5:00
|Glendale, Arizona, United States
|
|-
|NC
|align=center|12–6 (2)
|Eryk Anders
|NC (illegal knee)
|UFC Fight Night: Edwards vs. Muhammad
|
|align=center|1
|align=center|4:37
|Las Vegas, Nevada, United States
|
|-
|Loss
|align=center|12–6 (1)
|Kevin Holland
|Decision (split)
|UFC Fight Night: Covington vs. Woodley
|
|align=center|3
|align=center|5:00
|Las Vegas, Nevada, United States
|
|-
|Win
|align=center|12–5 (1)
|Maki Pitolo
|Submission (guillotine choke)
|UFC Fight Night: Lewis vs. Oleinik
|
|align=center|1
|align=center|3:41
|Las Vegas, Nevada, United States
|
|-
|Loss
|align=center|11–5 (1)
|Bartosz Fabiński
|Decision (unanimous) 
|Cage Warriors 113
|
|align=center|3
|align=center|5:00
|Manchester, England
|
|-
|Win
|align=center|11–4 (1)
|Deron Winn
|Decision (split) 
|UFC on ESPN: Reyes vs. Weidman 
|
|align=center|3
|align=center|5:00
|Boston, Massachusetts, United States
|
|-
|Win
|align=center|
|Bevon Lewis
|Decision (unanimous)
|UFC 238 
|
|align=center|3
|align=center|5:00
|Chicago, Illinois, United States
|
|-
|Loss
|align=center|9–4 (1)
|Edmen Shahbazyan
|Decision (split)
|The Ultimate Fighter: Heavy Hitters Finale 
|
|align=center|3
|align=center|5:00
|Las Vegas, Nevada, United States
|   
|-
|Win
|align=center|9–3 (1)
|Charles Byrd
|TKO (punches and elbows)
|UFC 228 
|
|align=center|2
|align=center|2:17
|Dallas, Texas, United States
|
|-
|Win
|align=center|8–3 (1)
|Eric Spicely
|TKO (punches)
|UFC Fight Night: Thompson vs. Till
|
|align=center|2
|align=center|1:47
|Liverpool, England
|
|- 
|Loss
|align=center|7–3 (1)
|Julian Marquez
|Submission (guillotine choke)
|UFC on Fox: Lawler vs. dos Anjos 
|
|align=center|2
|align=center|2:42
|Winnipeg, Manitoba, Canada
|
|-  
| Loss
| align=center|7–2 (1)
| Karl Roberson
| Submission (rear-naked choke)
| UFC Fight Night: Poirier vs. Pettis
| 
| align=center|1
| align=center|3:41
| Norfolk, Virginia, United States
|
|-
| Loss
| align=center| 7–1 (1)
| Francimar Barroso
| Decision (unanimous)
| UFC Fight Night: Manuwa vs. Anderson
| 
| align=center|3
| align=center| 5:00
| London, England
|
|-
| NC
| align=center| 7–0 (1)
| Francimar Barroso
| NC (overturned)
| UFC Fight Night: Bader vs. Nogueira 2
| 
| align=center|1
| align=center| 1:34
| São Paulo, Brazil
|
|-
| Win
| align=center| 7–0
| Boubacar Balde
| TKO (punches)
| Cage Warriors 77
| 
| align=center|3
| align=center| 1:28
| London, England
|
|-
| Win
| align=center| 6–0
| James Hurrell
| TKO (punches)
| Cage Warriors 75
| 
| align=center|1
| align=center| 0:37
| London, England
|
|-
| Win
| align=center| 5–0
| Grégory Pierre
| Decision (unanimous)
| Killacam Fight Night 9
| 
| align=center|3
| align=center| 5:00
|Kent, England
| 
|-
| Win
| align=center| 4–0
| Carl Kinslow
| KO (knee)
| Killacam Fight Night 8
| 
| align=center|1
| align=center| 4:56
| Kent, England
|Won the Killacam Light Heavyweight Championship.
|-
| Win
| align=center| 3–0
| Lloyd Clarkson
| Decision (unanimous)
| Warrior Fight Series 3
| 
| align=center|3
| align=center| 5:00
| London, England
|
|-
| Win
| align=center| 2–0
| Pelu Adetola
| TKO (knees)
| Cage Warriors 74
| 
| align=center|1
| align=center| 2:24
| London, England
|
|-
| Win
| align=center| 1–0
| Michael Revenscroft
| TKO (elbows)
| Cage Warriors 69
| 
| align=center|1
| align=center| 1:23
| London, England
|
|-

See also

 List of male mixed martial artists

References

External links
 
 

Living people
1990 births
English male mixed martial artists
Light heavyweight mixed martial artists
Middleweight mixed martial artists
Mixed martial artists utilizing taekwondo
Mixed martial artists utilizing Brazilian jiu-jitsu
People from Poplar, London
Sportspeople from London
English sportspeople of Jamaican descent
English people of Saint Vincent and the Grenadines descent
English male taekwondo practitioners
English practitioners of Brazilian jiu-jitsu
Ultimate Fighting Championship male fighters